Virginia Lakes refers to a basin of lakes in the Eastern Sierra Nevada in Mono County, California. Virginia Lakes is located a few miles off U.S. Highway 395; the road to the lakes turns off U.S. 395 at Conway Summit, roughly halfway between Bridgeport, California, to the north and Lee Vining, California, to the south, in the Humboldt-Toiyabe National Forest. The name can also refer to two lakes within the basin: Little or Lower Virginia Lake and Upper or Big Virginia Lake. The area is part of the Virginia Lakes census-designated place.

Features
Located in the Virginia Lakes area are a resort, pack station, and small community. Virginia Lakes is popular with anglers, hikers, and campers. A trail beginning at Virginia Lakes serves as a gateway to the Sierra backcountry and Yosemite National Park.

Lakes
The bodies of water in the Virginia Lakes Basin include Trumbull Lake, Red Lake, Blue Lake, Upper Virginia Lake, Little Virginia Lake, Cooney Lake, Moat Lake, and the Frog Lakes. These are all connected by the perennial Virginia Creek (not navigable).

See also
List of lakes in California

References

Lakes of the Sierra Nevada (United States)
Lakes of Mono County, California
Humboldt–Toiyabe National Forest
Lakes of California
Lakes of Northern California